Major General Don William Nabasa, is a Ugandan military officer in the Uganda People's Defence Forces (UPDF). He currently serves as the Commander of the UPDF Military Police, effective 26 October 2021. Before that, he was the Commander of the Uganda Contingent in Somalia as part of AMISOM.

Previously, Nabasa was the Commander of the Special Forces Command (SFC), an elite unit that is responsible for the security of the President of Uganda, and that of traditional cultural leaders and vital national installations, as well as the country's oil fields. He assumed command of the SFC, in January 2017, taking over from Muhoozi Kainerugaba, who was appointed Senior Presidential Adviser on military affairs.

Background
He was born in the Western Region of Uganda, circa 1976.

Military education
Don Nabasa joined the Uganda military in 1998. In 1999, he was commissioned as a Second Lieutenant, following the completion of an Officer Cadet Course at UPDF School of Infantry, then located in Jinja, in Uganda's Eastern Region.

Over the years, Don Nabasa has attended  many military courses, including the following:

Military career
Over the years, Nabasa has commanded various units in the UPDF, starting with an Infantry Platoon in 1999, then a tank platoon in 2000, then serving as a brigade operations officer from 2004 until 2005. 

He commanded a tank squadron between 2000 and 2007, then as the commanding officer of a battalion from 2008 until 2012 and as commander of a Group, from 2012 until 2016. From 2016 until his assignment to head the SFC, he served as the Deputy Commander of the Special Forces Command, a division within the UPDF.

In February 2019 he was promoted from the rank of Brigadier to that of Major General, as a part of a promotions exercise involving over 2,000 men and women of the UPDF.

In November 2021, he officially assumed office as the Commander of the UPDF Military Police, from Brigadier Keith Katungi, who will exchange positions with him and head to Somalia as Commander of the Ugandan unit at AMISOM.

Other responsibilities
Brigadier Don Nabasa commanded operations in Somalia, in 2014, as part of the AMISOM peace-keeping mission, sanctioned by the United Nations, and operated by the African Union.

See also
 Sabiiti Muzeyi
 Uganda People's Defence Forces
 Wilson Mbadi

References

External links
 New Guard Takes Charge of UPDF In New Changes 

People from Mbarara District
Living people
1976 births
Ugandan military personnel
Ugandan generals